OroraTech is a German aerospace start-up company providing wildfire monitoring by employing nanosatellites. It was founded in 2018 as a university spin-off at the Technical University of Munich (TUM). The headquarters are in Munich, Germany.

History 

OroraTech's key idea had been developed during the MOVE-II CubeSat project and WARR at the TUM. Starting as a spin-off in January 2017, the company was incorporated as Orbital Oracle Technologies GmbH (short: OroraTech) in September 2018. Since OroraTech's technology is based on academic research at the TUM, TUM professors Ulrich Walter, a former astronaut, and Alexander W. Koch act as advisors to the company.

Technology 

Wildfire detection using infrared sensors in space had been proposed as a technology since the 1990s. Technological advances, notably sunk space launch cost, enabled non-state actors to enter the market. As such, OroraTech operates a software platform for the detection and monitoring of wildfires based on measuring thermal-infrared radiation from space. The company is using data from existing satellites and develops their own constellation of 3-U CubeSats with thermal-infrared cameras to further improve temporal and spatial resolution of fire detection.

The software platform generates various overlays on base maps to visualize fire risk and fire detections. At the current stage, the platform uses data from twelve satellites in polar and geostationary orbits, including such by NASA, ESA, and EUMETSAT. In early 2020, the platform had around 100 active users.

The satellite technology is based on research from the MOVE-II project at the Chair of Astronautics (LRT) at the TUM. During the project, a 1-Unit CubeSat was launched with SpaceX in December 2018. OroraTech's first nanosatellite, based on the original CubeSat, was developed to reach 10 cm x 10 cm x 34 cm in size, weighing around 1.2 kg, and it was launched on 13 January 2022 as part of SpaceX's Transporter-3 rideshare mission. The satellite features an uncooled thermal-infrared imager for space applications, and GPU-accelerated on-orbit processing to reduce downlink latency and bandwidth for quicker wildfire alert dissemination, making it particularly efficient in tackling the issue of detecting wildfires in late afternoon images.

As of June 2022, the company plans to put its next eight satellites into orbit by the end of 2023, aiming for a detection time of 30 minutes.

Field application 

The technology is used by Wildfire Services in British Columbia (Canada) and New South Wales (Australia) for wildfire detection and wildfire suppression. International media used images from OroraTech's wildfire service for coverage of the 2020 wildfire season in California, 
Oregon, British Columbia, and Siberia.

References 

Aerospace engineering organizations
Remote sensing companies
Scientific organisations based in Germany